The Serenade for String Orchestra in E minor, Op. 20, is an early piece in three short movements, by Edward Elgar. It was written in March 1892 and first performed privately in that year; its public premiere was in 1896. It became one of Elgar's most popular compositions, and has been recorded many times.

Background and first performances 
In 1892 Elgar had yet to achieve the public recognition that came to him by the end of the decade. His compositions did not earn him enough to support his wife and daughter; he earned most of his living conducting local musical ensembles and teaching in his native Worcestershire, while continuing to compose.

The Serenade for Strings may be a revised version of an earlier set of Three Sketches for Strings, performed in May 1888 at a concert of the Worcestershire Musical Union. The sketches had the individual titles "Spring Song" (Allegro), "Elegy" (Adagio) and Finale (Presto); the manuscript of the Three Sketches does not survive, and their connection with the Serenade is conjectural. The Serenade was the first of Elgar's compositions with which he professed himself happy. He wrote to a friend about the three movements, "I like 'em (the first thing I ever did)". The critic Ernest Newman wrote in a 1906 study of Elgar that the Serenade and the concert overture Froissart (1890) were the only two works of importance among the composer's output before the mid 1890s: "the rest are experiments in various smaller forms – songs, pieces for piano and violin, part songs, slight pieces for small orchestra, &c".

The work was first given in a private performance in 1892 by the Worcester Ladies' Orchestral Class, with the composer conducting. His first attempt to interest a publisher in the piece was rebuffed on the grounds that though it was "very good", "this class of music is practically unsaleable", but he found a publisher in 1893. The Serenade received its first public performance in Antwerp, Belgium on 21 July 1896, but was not given publicly in Britain until 1899. Two movements were played at a concert in the Grand Pump Room at Bath in January of that year; the complete work was played at a concert in York on 5 April 1899, conducted by Thomas Tertius Noble; and the composer conducted it at an all-Elgar concert in the seaside resort New Brighton on 16 July 1899. The work is dedicated to the organ builder and amateur musician Edward W. Whinfield, who had encouraged the composer in his early years.

Structure 
The work typically plays for between 12 and 13 minutes in performance.

1. Allegro piacevole. The metronome mark is ♩. = 96. The gently rocking  metre of the first movement, the direction "piacevole" (pleasantly/agreeably) and avoidance of harmonic tension suggest a cradle song, according to the analyst Daniel Grimley, and an aubade according to Elgar's biographer Michael Kennedy. The movement opens with a figure in the violas that recurs throughout:

The main theme is heard from the third bar:

The middle section is an arching melody, moving briefly into the minor, before  the coda presents a new theme derived from the opening subject, which itself returns to bring the movement to a quiet conclusion.

2. Larghetto. The second movement, marked ♪=80, is in  time. After a brief introduction the main theme is what Newman describes as "a long and flexible melody sung by the first violins … one of the finest and most sustained that ever came from Elgar's pen":

The introductory theme returns at the end of the movement as a peroration.

3.  Allegretto. The finale begins in  time, ♩. = 92, changing to  when Elgar reintroduces the main theme of the first movement to bring the work to a conclusion.

Recordings 
The Serenade has become one of Elgar’s most popular works, particularly with amateur groups, youth ensembles, and chamber orchestras, and is among the most recorded of his compositions.

Notes, references and sources

Notes

References

Sources

External links 

Performance by A Far Cry from the Isabella Stewart Gardner Museum in MP3 format
 Programme notes from BBC Radio 3

Elgar
Compositions by Edward Elgar
Compositions for string orchestra
1892 compositions
Compositions in E minor